Vincent Lucas Weijl (born 11 November 1990) is a Dutch professional footballer who plays for Amsterdamsche FC as a midfielder.

During his career he played in the Netherlands, Spain, Hong Kong, Denmark, Malaysia, Georgia and Iceland, with an additional two-year spell at Liverpool in which he collected no first-team appearances.

Club career
Born in Amsterdam, Weijl came through the youth ranks at AZ Alkmaar, moving to Liverpool in the 2008 summer transfer window, aged 17. Limited to reserve football, he was loaned to Eerste Divisie club Helmond Sport in January 2010.

On 27 August 2010, Weijl signed for Spanish side SD Eibar on a two-year contract, being sparingly used by the Segunda División B team (less than one third of the league matches in his only full season). In January 2012 he returned to his country and joined SC Cambuur, also in the second level.

After a few months in the United States in which he only played for reserve teams, Weijl moved to South China AA on 5 December 2013. He scored his first goal in the Hong Kong First Division League on 18 January of the following year, to help to a 4–1 away win against Citizen AA.

After an unassuming spell back in Spain with CF Fuenlabrada, Weijl moved teams and countries again in the 2016 January transfer window, signing with FC Fredericia in the Danish 1st Division. In December of that year, he left the latter club.

In the following years Weijl rarely settled with a club, representing in quick succession PKNP FC (Malaysia Premier League), FC Samtredia (Georgian Erovnuli Liga) and Íþróttabandalag Akraness (Icelandic second tier).

References
Infobox statistics

General

External links

Stats at Voetbal International 
South China official profile

 Vincent Weijl Interview

1990 births
Living people
Footballers from Amsterdam
Dutch footballers
Association football midfielders
Liverpool F.C. players
Eerste Divisie players
Tweede Divisie players
Helmond Sport players
SC Cambuur players
Amsterdamsche FC players
Segunda División B players
SD Eibar footballers
CF Fuenlabrada footballers
Hong Kong First Division League players
South China AA players
Tai Po FC players
Danish 1st Division players
FC Fredericia players
PKNP FC players
Erovnuli Liga players
FC Samtredia players
Íþróttabandalag Akraness players
Netherlands youth international footballers
Dutch expatriate footballers
Expatriate footballers in England
Expatriate footballers in Spain
Expatriate footballers in Hong Kong
Expatriate men's footballers in Denmark
Expatriate footballers in Malaysia
Expatriate footballers in Georgia (country)
Expatriate footballers in Iceland
Dutch expatriate sportspeople in England
Dutch expatriate sportspeople in Spain
Dutch expatriate sportspeople in Hong Kong
Dutch expatriate sportspeople in Malaysia
Dutch expatriate sportspeople in Georgia (country)
Dutch expatriate sportspeople in Iceland